Victor Sylvestre Mpindi Ekani (born 27 February 1997) is a Cameroonian footballer who plays for Örebro SK on loan from Vendsyssel FF.

Honours
SønderjyskE
Danish Cup: 2019–20

References

1997 births
Living people
Cameroonian footballers
Cameroonian expatriate footballers
Association football midfielders
SønderjyskE Fodbold players
Örebro SK players
Vendsyssel FF players
Danish Superliga players
Danish 1st Division players
Superettan players
Expatriate men's footballers in Denmark
Expatriate footballers in Sweden
Cameroonian expatriate sportspeople in Denmark
Cameroonian expatriate sportspeople in Sweden